Rumen Khristov (born 20 September 1954) is a Bulgarian rower.

Khristov was born in 1954. At the 1972 World Rowing Junior Championships he came third in the B-final in the junior men's coxed pair. At the 1973 European Rowing Championships he came sixth in the men's coxed four.

Khristov competed at the 1976 Summer Olympics in the coxed pair with Tsvetan Petkov as his rowing partner and Todor Kishev as the coxswain and they came fourth. At the 1977 World Rowing Championships he won a bronze medal in the coxed four. He also came seventh in the men's eight. At the 1978 World Rowing Championships he won bronze in the coxed four and came fifth in the coxed pair.

At the 1980 Summer Olympics, he came fifth in the coxed pair.

References

1954 births
Living people
Bulgarian male rowers
Olympic rowers of Bulgaria
Rowers at the 1976 Summer Olympics
Rowers at the 1980 Summer Olympics
Place of birth missing (living people)
World Rowing Championships medalists for Bulgaria